Clemens Zeller (born July 2, 1984) is an Austrian male sprinter.

Achievements

References

1984 births
Living people
Austrian male sprinters
Universiade medalists in athletics (track and field)
Universiade silver medalists for Austria
Medalists at the 2009 Summer Universiade